Banaruiyeh Rural District is a rural district (dehestan) in Banaruiyeh District, Larestan County, Fars Province, Iran. At the 2006 census, its population was 3,890, in 941 families.  The rural district has 29 villages.

References 

Rural Districts of Fars Province
Larestan County